The following is a list of notable events and releases of the year 1945 in Norwegian music.

Events

Deaths

 May
 11 – Edvard Sylou-Creutz, classical pianist, composer and radio personality (born 1881).

 July
 12 – Bjørn Talén, operatic singer (born 1890).

 December
 22 – Johan Austbø, teacher, dancer, poet, composer, and singer (born 1879).

Births

 January
 2 – Terje Bjørklund, jazz pianist and composer.

 March
 19 – Bjørn Moe, orchestra conductor and associate professor at the Norwegian University of Science and Technology.

 April
 1 – Bjørnar Andresen, jazz upright bassist (died 2004).
 25 – Halvard Kausland, jazz guitarist (died 2017).

 June
 3 – Bjørn Alterhaug, jazz bassist, arranger, composer and Professor of music.
 27 – Ragnar Søderlind,  composer.
 28 – Magni Wentzel, jazz singer and guitarist.

 September
 2 – Svein Finnerud, jazz pianist, painter and graphic artist (died 2000).
 16 – Dag Frøland, comedian, singer and variety artist (died 2010).

 October
 5 – Inga Juuso, Sami singer and actress (died 2014).
 20 – Trond Kverno, contemporary composer.
 27 – Arild Andersen, jazz upright bassist and composer.

 November
 13 – Knut Riisnæs, jazz saxophonist.

See also
 1945 in Norway
 Music of Norway

References

 
Norwegian music
Norwegian
Music
1940s in Norwegian music